Herbert Alfred Humphrey MInstCE MIMechE MIEE FCGI (2 December 1868 – 9 March 1951) was a British engineer, inventor of the Humphrey pump.

Humphrey was born in Gospel Oak, London. Edith Humphrey was his younger sister. He trained at the Finsbury Technical College and the Central Institution (which later became the City and Guilds College).

He patented the Humphrey pump in 1906. During World War I he worked as a chemical engineer, working on improving the production of explosives.

He was awarded the Melchett Medal in 1939 by the Institute of Fuel. In 1945, he retired to Hermanus, Cape Province, Union of South Africa. He died there in 1951.

Personal life
He was married to Mary Elizabeth Horniblow. They had three sons and two daughters, including the bacteriologist John H. Humphrey.

A collection of Humphrey's papers is held in the archives of Imperial College London.

External links

References

1868 births
1951 deaths
British chemical engineers
People from the London Borough of Camden